Tamerlano (Tamerlane, HWV 18) is an opera seria in three acts by George Frideric Handel. The Italian libretto was by Nicola Francesco Haym, adapted from Agostin Piovene's Tamerlano together with another libretto entitled Bajazet after Nicolas Pradon's Tamerlan, ou La Mort de Bajazet. The opera was staged by the Royal Academy of Music in the King's Theatre at the Haymarket, London.

History and context 

The German-born Handel, after spending some of his early career composing operas and other pieces in Italy, settled in London, where in 1711 he had brought Italian opera for the first time with his opera Rinaldo. A tremendous success, Rinaldo created a craze in London for Italian opera seria, a form focused overwhelmingly on solo arias for the star virtuoso singers. In 1719, Handel was appointed music director of an organisation called the Royal Academy of Music (unconnected with the present day London conservatoire), a company under royal charter to produce Italian operas in London. Handel was not only to compose operas for the company but hire the star singers, supervise the orchestra and musicians, and adapt operas from Italy for London performance.

Viewed as one of Handel's major works, he composed it in the space of 20 days in July 1724, in a year in which two more great operas were composed by him: Giulio Cesare and Rodelinda. Eve Meyer has noted that the role of Bajazet was one of the first major tenor roles in opera, and has also commented on the place of the opera in the context of the contemporary fashion for Turkish culture (turquerie).<ref>Meyer, Eve R., "Turquerie and Eighteenth-Century Music" (Summer 1974).  'Eighteenth-Century Studies, 7(4), .</ref>

The opera is scored for two recorders, two flutes, two oboes, bassoon, two horns, strings, and continuo instruments (cello, lute, harpsichord).

18th century musicologist Charles Burney wrote of Tamerlano: "the overture is well known, and retains its favour among the most striking and agreeable of Handel’s instrumental productions.. Many of Handel’s operas offer perhaps more specimens of his fire and learning, but none more pleasing melodies and agreeable effects."

Paul Henry Lang wrote in 1966: "here the principal role, that of Bajazet, is given to a tenor....This is the first great tenor role in opera. Handel was entirely successful in portraying Bajazet."
 Performance history Tamerlano was first performed at the King's Theatre, London, on 31 October 1724, around the time of the annual performance of Nicholas Rowe's play of Tamerlane (4–5 November). There were 12 performances and it was repeated on 13 November 1731. The opera then received a production in Hamburg with the recitative in German and the arias in Italian. The first modern production was in Karlsruhe on 7 September 1924. Amongst recent productions, it appeared in the repertory of the Washington National Opera in 2008 and of the Los Angeles Opera in November 2009; both productions featured tenor Plácido Domingo who also appeared as Bajazet in a production at Teatro Real, Madrid, in 2008.
Roles

Synopsis
Place: Prusa
Time: 1402

 Act 1 

The defeated Ottoman Emperor Bajazet is brought in chains to the court of Tamerlano.  Tamerlano has ordered Andronico to remove the chains, but Bajazet is mistrustful of this action.  Bajazet adds that the only reason he does not commit suicide is his love for his daughter, Asteria. (Aria: "Forte e lieto a morte andrei").  Tamerlano arrives and orders Andronico to try and obtain Bajazet and Asteria's consent for Asteria to marry Tamerlano, with a reward for Andronico of the Greek throne, marriage with Irene, and freedom for Bajazet.  Andronico is troubled, as he brought his love Asteria to try and soften Tamerlano, only to see Tamerlano fall in love with her. (Aria: "Bella Asteria"). Tamerlano tells Asteria of his intentions and the offer to Andronico, which makes her angry at Andronico's seeming betrayal.

Bajazet declines Tamerlano's offer, and furthermore is angry at his daughter's seeming meekness at Tamerlano's demands. (Aria: "Ciel e terra armi di sdegno"). However, once alone, Asteria says that despite Andronico's apparent treachery, her feelings for him have not changed. (Aria: "Deh, lasciatemi.") Irene arrives to learn that she is no longer to marry Tamerlano, but instead Andronico.  Andronico tells Irene that she can still change the outcome if she pretends to be her own messenger and takes issue with Tamerlano.  She agrees to this plan, while he bemoans his current compromised situation.

 Act 2 

Tamerlano tells Andronico of Asteria's acceptance of his marriage proposal, and that the two planned weddings, of Tamerlano to Asteria and of Andronico to Irene, will happen soon.  Tamerlano and Asteria sing contrasting arias at the situation.  Asteria pretends to tell Andronico that she is about to marry Tamerlano, but through a misunderstanding, Andronico is left dejected at the thought.  Meanwhile, Leone brings the disguised Irene to Tamerlano, where she pleads Irene's case. (Aria: "Par che mi nasca.")  Tamerlano hears her with composure.  When Irene and Asteria are alone, Asteria shows sympathy towards Irene and speaks of her own feelings.  Irene finds hope in this revelation, while Leone "comments only on love's irresistible power for good or evil".

Bajazet is outraged at his daughter's impending marriage to Tamerlano and swears to stop this, while Andronico is furious and resolves to have his vengeance on Tamerlano before he kills himself.  Asteria is secretly preparing to kill Tamerlano in the meantime.  However, Bajazet manages to stall the wedding, and also avoids being humiliated by Tamerlano when he is stopped.  Asteria makes a move to the dais, only for her father to stop her.  She then pulls out a dagger, saying that it would have been her present to Tamerlano.  After a trio between Tamerlano, Bajazet, and Asteria, Tamerlano orders the death of Bajazet and Asteria.  However, Asteria protests that she has never been unfaithful and gets agreement from Bajazet, Andronico, and Irene, which gives her some feeling of happiness.  She also feels sad that her plans for assassination failed and that she has lost her chance for happiness.

 Act 3 

Asteria and Bajazet decide to kill themselves with concealed poison.  Alone, Asteria contemplates her oncoming death.  Tamerlano makes one last attempt to win Asteria and says that he will even pardon her father.  However, Andronico and Asteria declare their love for each other, which enrages Tamerlano and makes him swear his own revenge.  Bajazet tries to gain inspiration from their action, while the couple can only find happiness in facing together whatever may come of declaring their mutual love.

Meanwhile, Irene pledges her love to Tamerlano if he returns his own love to her, while Leone hopes that ultimately love will win the day over revenge.  Tamerlano prepares to humiliate his enemies, and begins by bringing Bajazet and then Asteria before him.  Andronico pleads for mercy from Tamerlano.  Tamerlano will not listen, and orders Asteria to become his servant, and that she must first serve him wine.  Asteria puts the poison from her father into the cup.  Irene then reveals her true identity to Tamerlano and the situation of the poisoned cup.  Tamerlano then orders Asteria to decide who first to give the cup to, her father or Andronico, before she may bring it to him.  Asteria is about to drink from the cup herself when Andronico hits it out of her hand, which further enrages Tamerlano.  He orders Asteria's arrest and confinement in the common seraglio, and that Bajazet will have to see her being shamed.  Bajazet, angry at this situation, declares that his spirit will haunt Tamerlano when he has died. (Aria:''''Empio, per farti guerra".)

Irene and Tamerlano sing of the happy life that awaits them, after Tamerlano has had his revenge.  Leone then reports the arrival of Asteria and Bajazet.  Bajazet is surprisingly serene now, but finally reveals that this is because he has taken poison.  As he becomes more incoherent, he says goodbye to his daughter and berates Tamerlano, until Andronico and Asteria carry him out of the room.  Asteria then returns to ask for death, since Tamerlano can never get what he wants from her.  Both Irene and Andronico send after Asteria to try and stop her suicide, while Tamerlano is finally changed by the events he has witnessed as well as by Irene's pleas.  He finally pardons Asteria, Andronico, and Bajazet.  The opera concludes with a love duet between Tamerlano and Irene, and the chorus sings of love's ability to save light from the dark.

Recordings

Audio recordings

Video recordings

See also 

 Bajazet by Vivaldi using the same libretto by Piovenne.

References
Notes

Sources
 The first of the two volume definitive reference on the operas of Handel

External links

Hicks, A., (1992) "Tamerlano", The New Grove Dictionary of Opera, ed. Stanley Sadie. London: Macmillan 
  

Italian libretto
Score of Tamerlano (ed. Friedrich Chrysander, Leipzig 1876)

Operas by George Frideric Handel
Italian-language operas
1724 operas
Operas
Operas set in Turkey
Operas based on real people
Cultural depictions of Timur
Operas set in the 14th century
Operas set in the 15th century